Battle of Tartu can refer to one of the following campaigns in the city of Tartu and along the Suur Emajõgi river:
Siege of Tartu in 1224 during the Livonian Crusade
Battle of Tartu in the Estonian War of Independence, 13-14 January 1919
Battle of Tartu in the Summer War, 9–25 July 1941
Tartu Offensive, 10 August – 6 September 1944